After Hours is the second studio album from the Australian rock band Little River Band, released in April 1976. It peaked at No. 5 on the Australian Kent Music Report Albums Chart.

Lead singer Glenn Shorrock names this album as his favourite album by the band.

The album was released in the US in 1980.

In between the recording of After Hours and Diamantina Cocktail, two founding members of the band departed: Ric Formosa (lead guitar) and Roger McLachlan (bass).

Reception

The Allmusic rating for After Hours is for the 1980 US version that is a compilation of leftovers from the Australian albums following the international release of Diamantina Cocktail.

Track listing

Australian and European version 
Side A
 "Days on the Road" (G. Goble) – 5:20
 "Everyday of My Life" (B. Birtles) – 3:45
 "Broke Again" (B. Birtles/G. Goble) – 3:25
 "Seine City" (G. Shorrock) – 3:43
 "Another Runway" (B. Birtles/R. Formosa) – 6:28

Side B
 "Bourbon Street" (R. Formosa) – 4:22
 "Sweet Old Fashioned Man" (G. Shorrock) – 4:34
 "Take Me Home" (B. Birtles) – 5:09
 "Country Girls" (G. Goble) – 7:11

US version 
 "Seine City" (G. Shorrock) – 3:46
 "Bourbon Street" (R. Formosa) – 4:22
 "Sweet Old Fashioned Man" (G. Shorrock) – 4:38
 "Country Girls" (G. Goble) – 7:13
 "The Drifter" (G. Goble) – 3:53
 "L.A. in the Sunshine" (D. Briggs/G. Shorrock) – 3:07
 "Witchery" (B. Birtles) – 2:48
 "Raelene Raelene" (B. Birtles) – 4:27
 "Changed and Different" (G. Goble) – 4:02
 "The Butterfly" (live) (traditional) – 2:41*
 "Days on the Road" (live) (G. Goble) – 5:20*
 "Long Jumping Jeweller" (G. Shorrock) – 4:46*

 *1997 re-release bonus tracks

Personnel

 Beeb Birtles – lead vocals, guitars
 Ric Formosa – guitars, slide guitar, dobro, lead vocals on "Bourbon Street"
 Graham Goble – vocals, guitars
 Roger McLachlan – bass guitar
 Derek Pellicci – drums, percussion
 Glenn Shorrock – lead vocals, harmonica, acoustic guitar on "Seine City"

Additional musicians 

 Accordion [Piano Accordion] – Aurora Moratti
 Alto Saxophone, Flute – Graeme Lyall
 Cor Anglais – Eddy Denton
 Keyboards – Ian Mason
 Mandolin – Kerryn Tolhurst
 Steel Guitar [Pedal] – Mike Burke (3)
 Tenor Saxophone – Tony Buchanan
 Trombone – Don Lock
 Trumpet – Bobby Vinier, Peter Salt

Production details 

 Engineering – Ross Cockle (recording and remix)
 Producer – Little River Band

Charts

References 

1976 albums
Little River Band albums
Capitol Records albums
EMI Records albums
One Way Records albums